Abdallah ibn Buluggin, full name:ʿAbd Allāh ben Buluggīn ben Bādīs ben Ḥabūs ben Zīrī (1056–after 1090), also known as "Al-Muzaffar" (the conqueror), was the grandson of Badis ben Habus and the last Zirid ruler of the Taifa of Granada (1073–1090).

Biography 
When his grandfather died in 1073, the territory of the Zirids in al-Andalus was divided between Abdullah and his brother Tamim. Although he was younger than Tamim, in 1064 Abdallah had been named the successor of Badis ibn Habus, who preferred him to his own son, Maksan, (uncle of Tamim and Abdallah).

His memoirs 
During his exile in Aghmat, Abdullah ibn Buluggin wrote his memoirs and the history of the Zirids in Granada. It is called Al-Tibyan an al-haditha al-kaina bi-dawlat Bani Ziri fi Gharnata (An Expositon of the Downfall of the Zirid Dynasty in Granada).

Notes

Sources 
 
 

Zirid kings of Granada
11th-century rulers in Al-Andalus
11th-century Berber people
Berber writers
Berber rulers
11th-century writers from al-Andalus
1056 births
Year of death unknown